Kent Lockhart (1963 – January 28, 2023) was an American professional basketball player. He played college basketball for the UTEP Miners and was drafted by the New York Knicks in the 1985 NBA draft. He had a three-year career in the National Basketball League (NBL) in Australia for the Eastside Spectres, where he was a two-time All-NBL Team recipient.

Early life
Lockhart was born in Palo Alto, California.

College career
Lockhart played four years of college basketball for the UTEP Miners. In 120 games between 1981 and 1985, he averaged 8.1 points, 2.9 rebounds and 2.3 assists in 26.5 minutes per game. As of 2022, his 279 career assists is ranked tenth all-time in UTEP Miners history.

Professional career

NBA draft and CBA
Lockhart was selected by the New York Knicks in the sixth round of the 1985 NBA draft with the 119th overall pick. He went on to play four games for the Albany Patroons of the Continental Basketball Association (CBA) during the 1985–86 season.

Australia
Lockhart later moved to Australia and played for the Sandringham Sabres in the Victorian Basketball Association.

In 1989, Lockhart joined the Eastside Spectres and made his debut in the National Basketball League (NBL). He recorded a career-high 47 points during his first season and was named to the All-NBL First Team. He earned All-NBL Second Team honours in 1990 and played a starring role in the Spectres' run to the NBL Grand Final series against the Perth Wildcats in 1991. He averaged 24.3 points, 6.6 rebounds, 3.8 assists and 1.5 steals in his three-year NBL career, going at 51 per cent from the field across 81 games.

Death
Lockhart died on January 28, 2023, at the age of 59.

References

External links

andthefoul.net profile
NBL stats

1963 births
2023 deaths
Albany Patroons players
American expatriate basketball people in Australia
American men's basketball players
Basketball players from California
Eastside Spectres players
Guards (basketball)
New York Knicks draft picks
Sportspeople from Palo Alto, California
UTEP Miners men's basketball players